Whitby Museum is an independent  museum in Whitby, North Yorkshire, England, run by Whitby Literary and Philosophical Society, a learned society and registered charity, established in 1823. It is located in a building opened in 1931 in Pannett Park, Whitby, which also contains the Society's Library and Archive.

The museum contains a wide range of material relating to the history of Whitby, and has specialist collections relating to:

Jurassic fossils, in particular ammonites and marine reptiles 
Whitby jet
 Captain James Cook and HM Bark Endeavour
 Whitby's whaling industry.

The museum also contains a Hand of Glory, the dried and pickled hand of a hanged man, said to have magical powers.

References

External links

Whitby Museum website

Whitby
Museums in North Yorkshire
Local museums in North Yorkshire
Art museums and galleries in North Yorkshire
Museums established in 1931
1931 establishments in England